Deer Creek is a town in Grant County, Oklahoma, United States. The population was 130 at the 2010 census, an 11.6 percent decrease from the figure of 147 in 2000. It was named for a nearby stream, which is a tributary of the Salt Fork of the Arkansas River.

History
The community began March 14, 1898, when W. A. Bradford, president of the Gulf Railroad bought  of land to establish a town along the route his railroad planned to use for a rail line between Medford and Blackwell, Oklahoma. The line was constructed in 1897-1898. On February 27, 1899, the post office at the nearby community of Orie was moved to Deer Creek.

The Deer Creek Mennonites organized on August 27, 1899, and opened a church in 1902. Soon, other denominations began meeting in the home of Elijah Franklin Webster, with a Methodist minister leading the service. The Christian and Methodist church buildings were constructed by 1909.

The first producing oil and gas wells in the area were drilled in the early 1920s, causing a brief boom. Deer Creek's population peaked at 312 in 1930. A prolonged population decline reached 124 in 1990. Except for one co-operative, most businesses had closed by 1998. There has been a small population increase in the 21st Century.

Geography
Deer Creek flows past approximately one mile east of the community.

Demographics

As of the census of 2000, there were 148 people, 57 households, and 40 families residing in the town. There were 76 housing units at an average density of 547.7 per square mile (209.6/km2). The racial makeup of the town was 86.39% White, 6.80% Native American, 4.76% from other races, and 2.04% from two or more races. Hispanic or Latino of any race were 6.12% of the population.

There were 56 households, out of which 32.1% had children under the age of 18 living with them, 66.1% were married couples living together, 3.6% had a female householder with no husband present, and 26.8% were non-families. 26.8% of all households were made up of individuals, and 16.1% had someone living alone who was 65 years of age or older. The average household size was 2.63 and the average family size was 3.20.

In the town, the population was spread out, with 31.3% under the age of 18, 7.5% from 18 to 24, 22.4% from 25 to 44, 19.7% from 45 to 64, and 19.0% who were 65 years of age or older. The median age was 38 years. For every 100 females, there were 98.6 males. For every 100 females age 18 and over, there were 98.0 males.

The median income for a household in the town was $36,563, and the median income for a family was $40,625. Males had a median income of $33,750 versus $25,625 for females. The per capita income for the town was $15,618. There were 8.9% of families and 14.0% of the population living below the poverty line, including 32.1% of under eighteens and none of those over 64.

Economy
The town economy has largely relied on the nearby wheat farms. According to the Encyclopedia of Oklahoma History and Culture, most businesses in town had closed by 1998, and nearly three quarters of the people who are employed commute elsewhere to work.

Notes

References

External links
 Encyclopedia of Oklahoma History and Culture - Deer Creek

Towns in Grant County, Oklahoma
Towns in Oklahoma
Populated places established in 1898